Bardidi is a Bengali drama film directed by Ajoy Kar, based on the novel of the same name by Sarat Chandra Chattopadhyay. This film was released in 1957 under the banner of Sarat Banichitra. In 1939 another film was released in the same name based on the same plot by Amar Mullick.

Plot
Suren is the son of a zamindar of Bangladesh lives his life in his own way. He takes up the job of private tutor for a girl whose elder sister is Madhabi, an ill-fated widow. But after a few days, he returns to his rich family and marries. But he can not forget Madhabi who loves him like an elder and caring sister. In the meantime, when Madhabi's sister-in-law drives her out of the house, Suren hears that and arranges to return the property to her.

Cast
 Uttam Kumar as Suren
 Chhabi Biswas
 Molina Devi as Madhabi
 Chhaya Devi
 Manju Dey as Manorama
 Pahari Sanyal as Suren's father
 Tulsi Chakraborty
 Dhiraj Bhattacharya
 Jiben Bose
 Anup Kumar
 Nripati Chattopadhyay
 Sandhyarani as Madhabi
 Dipti Roy as Suren's wife
 Menaka Devi as Bindu

References

External links
 

1957 films
Bengali-language Indian films
1950s Bengali-language films
Films based on works by Sarat Chandra Chattopadhyay
Indian drama films
Indian black-and-white films
Films based on Indian novels
Films directed by Ajoy Kar
1957 drama films